Sunn Raha Hai is an Indian Hindi-language song from the 2013 Bollywood film, Aashiqui 2. Composed by Ankit Tiwari, the song is sung by Ankit Tiwari, with lyrics penned by Sandeep Nath. This song along with "Tum Hi Ho" became very popular and was a chartbuster all over India. The song is picturised on Rahul Jaykar (Aditya Roy Kapoor) performing at a music concert, while the female version of the song is picturised on Arohi Keshav Shirke (Shraddha Kapoor) performing at a local bar.

Development
The song was recorded by Ankit Tiwari at the Phat Box Studios, Andheri (West), Mumbai. Pankaj Borah is the recording engineer of this track. There is also a female version of this track sung by Shreya Ghoshal which was also well received. Though the female version of the song uses the same lyrics and music as that of the male version, the difference lies in the instruments used. While the female version is supported by instruments like ghatam, flute, santoor and acoustic guitar, the male version features electronic distortion guitar, bass guitar, zitar and drums.

Critical reception

Sunn Raha Hai generally received positive reviews from critics. Times of India wrote− Singer Ankit Tiwari has done a fine job with Sunn raha hai. He maintains the standard created by Shreya in the female version. Ankit's voice suits the lyrics, but it is too lengthy to keep you hooked. Shivi from Koimoi wrote that Sunn Raha Hai, which is being publicized as the ‘love song of the year’ tries to live up to its publicity. Ankit Tiwari opens the track with the sound that reminds of Rahman’s Rockstar and gradually takes it to the same level. The track is full of melody and Ankit has done a good job here.
	 
Reviewers from Planet Bollywood stated that the song takes a while to grow on you but then you will be hooked. Music is contemporary rock with plenty of guitars, drums and percussions mixed in but it's the way Ankit evokes passion and feeling by muting everything during the beginning of each stanza that works so well particularly when it all progresses so effectively towards the chorus with a bang! Ankit chooses to sing himself and does so incredibly well for a composer and singer. His voice is soothing and emotional. Lyrics by Sandeep Nath are so painful and touching you can almost feel them.
	 
Rafat from Glamsham wrote:

Awards and nominations

Female version

	 
Sunn Raha Hai (Female Version) is a Hindi song from the 2013 super-hit Bollywood film, Aashiqui 2. Composed by Ankit Tiwari, the song is sung by Shreya Ghoshal, with lyrics penned by Sandeep Nath.

Development
The female version of "Sunn Raha Hai" was recorded by Shreya Ghoshal at the Phat Box Studios, Andheri (West), Mumbai. Pankaj Borah is the recording engineer of this track. Though the female version of the song uses the same lyrics and music as that of the male version, the difference lies in the instruments used. While the female version is supported by instruments like ghatam, flute, santoor and acoustic guitar, the male version features electronic distortion guitar, zitar and drums.

Critical reception
The female version of "Sunn Raha Hai" was acclaimed by critics, though it even got some average comments. Besides the music and lyrics, Ghoshal's rendition was also acclaimed.

Nayandeep of Koimoi commented− "There's almost nothing that this woman cannot do! The new age Lata Mangeshkar of sorts, Shreya Ghoshal made all of us teary eyed with the immensely thoughtful and lovelorn "Sun Raha Hai Na Tu" number from Aashiqui 2. Personally a favourite, Shreya infused life into the tear-jerker of sorts and somehow helped it connect with the masses like wild fire!" Reviewers of The Times of India wrote− Shreya has sung "Sun Raha Hai" effortlessly. However, except for the singer, there is nothing interesting to write about it. The lyrics are unimpressive, while the music is dull. Shivi of Koimoi stated− Queen of melody, Shreya Ghoshal, delivers her fantastic version of "Sunn Raha Hai". If in the earlier version Ankit Tiwari made you like the track; Shreya makes you fall in love with it. Ankit has kept this composition different from the earlier one, which pays off as it suits Shreya's voice better. Flute is used amply and increases the effect; however it is the voice which is spellbinding. Sandeep Nath's lyrics do the job and give the protagonists a chance to strengthen their characterisation. Rajiv Vijayakar of Bollywood Hungama remarked− It is Shreya who comes up trumps with her more Indian version, where we even have brief aalaaps. The flute, the santoor and even the ghatam pervade the lovely number while keeping the rhythm intact. And Sandeep Nath's lines are truly ingenious! Critics of Planet Bollywood said− Shreya Ghoshal sings in the superb reprise "Sunn Raha Hai (Female)" that features more traditional instrumentation including the flute. Rafat of Glamsham commented− "Sunn Raha Ha" female version is rendered to sublime perfection by Shreya Ghoshal and it's once again a treat to the ears, as was the male version. Bodrul Chaudhury of Bollyspice commented− This one (the female version) is also enjoyable to listen to due to Shreya's angelic voice which gives it spark. Both are winning tracks that certainly deserves a listen! Shresht Poddar of High on Score remarked− Shreya has added yet another notch in her ever growing belt with this track. No wonder she is called the modern nightingale of India! Critics of Bollymeaning.com wrote− And now, when we needed a girl to sing "Sunn Raha Hai Na Tu", they finally bring in Shreya Ghoshal. Really, the song that was in rock mood, Shreya is made to sing in all typical Indian girl style with sounds of bangles, ghatam, and lot of what-was-that-'90s-instrument-really. Very well sung, but I still like the guy version a lot more. And guys, it's ataayein. Karam ki adaayein would mean styles of grace. Seriously, lyrics fail! Reviewers of In.com said− Shreya Ghoshal takes her turn with Ankit Tiwari's 'Sunn Raha Hai', and flutes and santoor are added to the mix. Ghoshal makes no mistakes, but Ankit's original has a stronger impact than this softer version.

Accolades

Other versions 
"Sunn Raha Hai" (both male and female versions) was remade in Telugu as "Vintunnavva Nestham", for the 2014 film Nee Jathaga Nenundali; which is an official Telugu remake of Aashiqui 2. The lyrics were penned by Chandra Bose. Both Ankit Tiwari and Shreya Ghoshal return to sing their respective versions of the song in Telugu.

Ankit Tiwari sang a new version of this song as "Sunn Raha Hai - Reloaded" which was released as a single in 2015, the music video of which can be found on the T-Series YouTube channel.

Shreya Ghoshal sang a medley of two of her songs "Sunn Raha Hai" and "Rozana" which was composed by Rochak Kohli from the film Naam Shabana, as "Sunn Raha Hai - Rozana" on T-Series Mixtape in 2017. The music of the medley was directed by Abhijit Vaghani.

See also
 Aashiqui 2 (soundtrack)
 List of songs recorded by Ankit Tiwari

References

External links
 Lyrics and Translation
 Online streaming at Saavn
 Online streaming at Gaana.com

Hindi songs
Hindi film songs
2013 songs
Songs written for films
Ankit Tiwari songs
Songs with music by Ankit Tiwari